Mioawateria asarotum is a species of sea snail, a marine gastropod mollusk in the family Raphitomidae.

Description
The length of the shell attains 6.9 mm, its diameter 4.8 mm.

Distribution
This marine species was found off Indonesia and in the Arafura Sea, at depths between 884 m-891 m

References

External links

 MNHN, Paris: holotype
 

asarotum
Gastropods described in 1997